Jacques Peuchet (1758–1830) was a French jurist, statistician and compiler of archives. A monarchist, he was keeper of the archives of the French police. Karl Marx gave a vivid summary of Peuchet's career:

Life
Trained as a lawyer, Peuchet worked as a secretary to André Morellet in the 1780s. He wrote a (1789) 'Discours preliminaire' on police etc. for the Encyclopédie Méthodique He was also employed by Charles Alexandre de Calonne and Étienne Charles de Loménie de Brienne.

He inherited Morellet's archives, using them for several works on economics and statistics.

Works
 Dictionnaire universel de la géographie commerçante. 5 vols. Paris: Blanchon, 1793. 
 Vocabulaire des termes de commerce, banque, manufactures, navigation marchande, finance mercantile et statistique, 1801
 Statistique élémentaire de la France: contenant les principes de cette science et leur application à l'analyse de la richesse, des forces et de la puissance de l'Empire français: à l'usage des personnes qui se destinent à l'étude de l'administration, 1805
 Campaigns of the armies of France, in Prussia, Saxony, and Poland, Boston: Farrand, Mallory, and Co., 1808. Translated by Samuel Mackay from the French Campagne des armées françaises, en Prusse, en Saxe et en Pologne.

References

1758 births
1830 deaths
French jurists
French statisticians
French archivists